Notun Prithivi (Bengali: নোতুন পৃথিবী) is an Indian Bengali language weekly newspaper  published from Kolkata, West Bengal. It  was founded by Prabhat Ranjan Sarkar. The  current editor and publisher is Acarya Mantrasiddhananda Avadhuta. It is circulated on behalf of the Proutist Universal, India.

It has different sections: Adhyatmik Prasanga, PROUT Prabaktar Bhasay, Sambad Darpan, Deshe Deshe Ananda Marga, prabandha, khela, Narir Maryada, Swasthya, Prabhati and Itikatha.

List of editor-publishers (incomplete) 

 Acarya Piyushananda Avadhuta
 Acarya Abhibratananda Avadhuta
 Acarya Satyashivananda Avadhuta
 Acarya Mantrasiddhananda Avadhuta

References

External links 
 Official website
Notun Prithivi

Newspapers published in Kolkata
Bengali-language newspapers published in India
Culture of Kolkata
Prabhat Ranjan Sarkar